The 1978 Artistic Gymnastics World Cup was held in São Paulo, Brazil in 1978.

Medal winners

References

1978
Artistic Gymnastics World Cup
International gymnastics competitions hosted by Brazil
1978 in Brazilian sport